John Thomas Dixon (10 December 1923 – 20 January 2009) was an English footballer who played as an inside forward.

Born in Hebburn, Dixon played for county league side Spennymoor United before he signed as a professional for Aston Villa shortly after the Second World War.

Dixon had Alzheimer's disease, and died on 20 January 2009 in Good Hope Hospital, Sutton Coldfield.

Statistics

Club
Aston Villa
FA Cup: 1957

References

1923 births
2009 deaths
People from Hebburn
Footballers from Tyne and Wear
Association football inside forwards
English footballers
Spennymoor United F.C. players
Aston Villa F.C. players
English Football League players
Deaths from Alzheimer's disease
Deaths from dementia in England
FA Cup Final players